The Adventures of Kit Carson is an American Western that aired from 1951 to 1955 and consisted of 103 episodes. While airing, the show was shown in over 130 markets and was sold to the Coca-Cola Bottling Company by MCA-TV. After airing, MCA-TV acquired syndication rights to the show. In New York, the show aired on Tuesday evenings on  
WNBT (TV) and ran for thirty-minutes. The show starred Bill Williams in the title role as frontier scout Christopher "Kit" Carson, and Don Diamond co-starred as El Toro, Carson's Mexican companion. Though the show may have been inspired by the historic Kit Carson, it is not historically accurate.

In Omaha, there was a horse drawing competition to promote the show. The winner received a real Shetland pony. During the shows airtime, it received fair reviews from a variety of publications. Many critiques critiqued the direction of the show but generally liked the acting of Bill Williams and Don Diamond. However, for a children's show, it was well liked.

Premise 
The show is set in the Wild West in the late 19th century. Carson and El Toro, his Mexican partner, travel around the American West helping people.

Cast 

 Bill Williams as Kit Carson (103 Episodes)
 Don Diamond as El Toro (103 Episodes)
 John Cason as Carl Rigby, Deputy, Drayson's Henchman, Henchman Ben, Henchman Carson, Henchman Trig, Lead Henchman, Marshal Trent, Morgan, Porter, Stage Driver, Trigger Dawson, Wagon driver Morris (12 Episodes)  
 Peter Mamakos as El Broho, Benito Morales aka El Morosco, Henchman Spence, Hernandez, Marco Mesconti, Padre Diego, Ricardo (11 Episodes)  
 Boyd Stockman as Henchman, Henchman Joe, Henchman Pete, Last Stage Driver, Murdock (9 Episodes) 
 Carol Henry as Henchman, Deputy, Garth, Hadley Man, Hank, Ned, Outlaw (7 Episodes) 
 Tristam Coffin as Col. Culver, Maj. John Phelps, Malee, Mark Stacey, Padre, Taggart, The Baron (9 Episodes) 
 Richard Avonden as Don Felope, Barker, Captured Henchman, Henchman Wolf (9 Episodes) 
 Terry Frost as Commandant, Henchman, Langley, Sheriff (9 Episodes)

Episodes

Series overview

Season 1 (1951–52)

Season 2 (1952–53)

Season 3 (1953–54)

Season 4 (1954–55)

Production

Crew  

 Directors: John English, Lew Landers, Paul Landres, Philip Ford, Charles S. Gould, Derwin Abrahams, Will Sheldon, Norman Lloyd
 Producers: Leon Fromkess, Richard Irving
 Cinematography: Clark Ramsey, Joe Novack, John Macburnie 
 Editors:  Richard G. Wray, Dwight Caldwell, Edward A. Biery

Production Companies 

 Revue Productions 
 MCA - TV

Technical Aspects 

 Run Time: 30 minutes 
 Sound Mix: Mono 
 Color: Black and White  
 Aspect Ratio: 1.33 : 1

Early Promotion

KETV - Omaha 

 KETV held a pony drawing contest for children to promote The Adventures of Kit Carson. The promotion was targeted at children to determine who could draw the best horse. The winner of the competition received a real Shetland pony.

Reviews and Reception 
During The Adventures of Kit Carson's original air time, the show was generally well-received. The show saw several good reviews in trade press publications at the time.

Variety 

 Variety said that the show "fit like a glove into the groove for which it's patterned; and should keep the juves (and Coca-Cola) happy." Variety also said that Bill Williams and Don Diamond were "just okay."

S.S. Picturegoer 

 Called the show "energetic and likeable" but also critiqued the direction of the show. Additionally, they stated the plot was "well-constructed" and applauded the acting of Bill Williams and Don Diamond.

Streaming

Amazon Prime Video 
Limited episodes of The Adventures of Kit Carson are available to watch on Amazon Prime Video.

 40 episodes included with Amazon Prime subscription.

Roku Channel 

 49 Episodes of The Adventures of Kit Carson are available to watch for free on the Roku Channel. The available episodes are from the first and second season.

References

External links
 

1951 American television series debuts
1955 American television series endings
1950s Western (genre) television series
Cultural depictions of Kit Carson
NBC original programming
Television series set in the 19th century